MV Seramban is the name of a number of ships:-

MV Seramban, launched in 1945 as Empire Seafront.
MV Seramban, launched in 1945 as Empire Seagull.

Ship names